The following are flute makers who produce flutes from a wide variety of materials: